Succinic semialdehyde (SSA) is a GABA metabolite.  It is formed from GABA by the action of GABA transaminase and further oxidised to become succinic acid, which enters TCA cycle.

See also
 Succinic semialdehyde dehydrogenase deficiency
 4-aminobutyrate aminotransferase

References

Aldehydes
Carboxylic acids
Gamma-Hydroxybutyric acid
Aldehydic acids